Stove Top is a stuffing that was introduced by General Foods in 1972. It is a quick cooking ("instant") stuffing that is available in supermarkets. Unlike traditional stuffing, Stove Top can be prepared on the stove, in a pot, and can also be prepared in a microwave oven. It is used as a side dish for meals as well as a medium in which some meats (pork, chicken) can be baked. It is sold in boxes and canisters. In 2005 it was reported that Kraft Heinz, which has owned the brand since 1990, sells about 60 million boxes of Stove Top stuffing at Thanksgiving.

Invention and patent 
Ruth Siems was the home economist who first created the product. Her name was the first listed on United States Patent 3,870,803 for the product. Her patent was based on a certain size of bread crumb that makes the rehydration, or addition of water, work. In an interview with the Evansville Courier in 1991, Siems said the idea for the instant stuffing came from the marketing department, but it was up to the research and development staff to create the product. The test kitchens, the chefs, and all the workers in research and development were given an opportunity to develop the stuffing, but Siems' idea was the one the company chose.  The product originated with an idea from Jack Klinge of the marketing department for a stuffing flavored rice and, after that showed promise, Siems developed the bread crumb based dish we came to know as stove top stuffing.

Flavors 
There are a variety of flavours, including Chicken, Lower Sodium Chicken, Cornbread, Pork, Beef, Savory Herbs, Traditional Sage, Tomato & Onion, San Francisco Sourdough, Mushroom & Onion, Long Grain & Wild Rice and Roasted Garlic, Turkey, Apple and Cranberry.

References

External links 
 

Kraft Foods brands
Poultry dishes
Products introduced in 1972
Thanksgiving food